Augustus Gabriel de Vivier Tassin (1842–1893) was a French-born American soldier who served in the Union Army during the American Civil War. After the war he occupied a variety of posts in the American West. He made notable contributions in writing descriptive accounts of several Native American groups.

Life and career

Tassin was born in Paris on October 12, 1842, but immigrated to the United States at New Orleans, Louisiana, on October 25, 1852. When the Civil War broke out, he was living in Leopold, Indiana. He enlisted as a first  lieutenant in the 35th Indiana Infantry Regiment on September 15, 1861. During the war he rose to the rank of full colonel, with distinguished service in the Battle of Missionary Ridge in Tennessee and the campaigns for Atlanta and Nashville. In December 1870, he voluntarily left the American army in order to serve with the French military during the Franco-Prussian War. When he returned, Tassin reenlisted, rising from the rank of private to second lieutenant, first lieutenant, and captain. He was assigned to various military posts in California, Arizona Territory, and the Dakotas, as well as in New York, Virginia, and Washington, D.C. He was the Indian agent at the Colorado River Indian Agency in Parker, Arizona, when he died on October 19, 1893.

Writings

Tassin wrote descriptive and sometimes literary or whimsical accounts based on his army experiences in the American West. Most of these accounts were published as articles in the periodical Overland Monthly. They included discussions of the Koncow (Maidu) Indians of northeastern California, the Round Valley Indians of northwestern California, the Mohave on the lower Colorado River, native groups in the Pacific Northwest, and the Apache.

References

1842 births
1893 deaths
Writers from Paris
French emigrants to the United States
Union Army colonels
French military personnel of the Franco-Prussian War
American writers
United States Indian agents
United States Army officers
Burials at Arlington National Cemetery